The Pampas (from the , meaning "plain") are fertile South American low grasslands that cover more than  and include the Argentine provinces of Buenos Aires, La Pampa, Santa Fe, Entre Ríos, and Córdoba; all of Uruguay; and Brazil's southernmost state, Rio Grande do Sul.

The climate is temperate, with precipitation of  that is more or less evenly distributed throughout the year, making the soils appropriate for agriculture. The area is also one of the distinct physiography provinces of the larger Paraná–Paraguay plain division.

Topography
This region has generally low elevations, whose highest levels do not exceed 600 metres (1,970 feet) in altitude. The coastal areas and most of the Buenos Aires Province are predominantly plain (with some wetlands) and the interior areas (mainly in the southern part of the Brazilian state of Rio Grande do Sul and Uruguay) have low ranges of hills (like Serras de Sudeste in Brazil and Cuchilla Grande in Uruguay). Low hills covered by grasslands are called coxilhas in Portuguese and cuchillas in Spanish, and it is the most typical landscape of the countryside areas in the northern parts of the Pampas. The highest elevations of the Pampas region are found in the Sierra de la Ventana mountains, in the southern part of Buenos Aires Province, with 1,239 m (4,065 ft) at the summit of Cerro Tres Picos.

Climates

The climate of the Pampas is generally temperate, gradually giving way to a more humid subtropical climate in the north (Cfa, according to the Köppen climate classification); a cold semi-arid climate (BSk) on the southern and western fringes (like San Luis Province, western La Pampa Province and southern Buenos Aires Province); and an oceanic climate (Cfb) in the southeastern part (in the regions of Mar del Plata, Tandil and the Sierra de la Ventana mountains, Argentina). Summer temperatures are more uniform than winter temperatures, generally ranging from  during the day. However, most cities in the Pampas occasionally have high temperatures that push , as occurs when warm, dry, northerly winds blow from southern Brazil, northern Argentina or Paraguay. Autumn arrives gradually in March and peaks in April and May. The first frosts arrive in mid-April in the south and late May or early June in the north.

Winters are generally mild, but cold waves often occur. With strong northerly winds, days of over  can be recorded almost everywhere, and during cold waves, high temperatures can be only . Frost occurs everywhere in the Pampas, but it is much more frequent in the southwest than around the Parana and Uruguay Rivers. Snow almost never falls in the northernmost third and is rare and light elsewhere, except for exceptional events in which depths have reached . Springs are very variable; it is warmer than fall in most areas (especially in the west) but significantly colder along the Atlantic. Violent storms are more common as well as wide temperature variations: days of  can give way to nights of under  or even frost, all within only a few days.

It is highly seasonal in the West, with some places recording averages of 120 mm (4.7 in) monthly in the summer, and only 20 millimeters (0.8 in) monthly in the winter. The eastern areas have small peaks in the fall and the spring, with relatively rainy summers and winters that are only slightly drier. However, where summer rain falls as short, heavy storms, winter rain falls mostly as cold drizzle, and so the amount of rainy days is fairly constant. Very intense thunderstorms are common in the spring and summer, and it has among the most frequent lightning and highest convective cloud tops in the world. The severe thunderstorms produce intense hailstorms, both floods and flash floods, and the most consistently active tornado region outside the central and southeastern US.

Climate charts
Climate charts for different locations of the Pampas:

Wildlife 
Human activity has caused major changes to the wildlife of the Pampas. 

Most big or medium sized species such as the puma, rhea, Capybara, plains viscacha, maned wolf, marsh deer and Pampas deer have lost their habitats especially due to the spread of agriculture and ranching, and are only present in very few relicts of the pampas. Other species, such as the Jaguar and the Guanaco have been extirpated completely from this habitat.

Mammals that are still fairly present include Brazilian guinea pig, southern mountain cavy, coypu, Pampas fox, Geoffroy's cat, lesser grison, white-eared opossum, Molina's hog-nosed skunk, big lutrine opossum, big hairy armadillo and southern long-nosed armadillo.

Bird species of the pampas are ruddy-headed goose, pampas meadowlark, hudsonian godwit, maguari stork, white-faced ibis, white-winged coot, southern screamer, dot-winged crake, curve-billed reedhaunter, burrowing owl and the rhea.

Invasive species include the European hare, wild boar and house sparrow.

Vegetation 

Historically, frequent wildfires ensured that only small plants such as grasses flourished, while trees were less common. The dominant vegetation types are grassy prairie and grass steppe, in which numerous species of the grass genus Stipa are particularly conspicuous. "Pampas grass" (Cortaderia selloana) is an iconic species of the Pampas. Vegetation typically includes perennial grasses and herbs. Different strata of grasses occur because of gradients of water availability.

The World Wildlife Fund divides the Pampas into three distinct ecoregions. The Uruguayan Savanna lies east of the Paraná River, and includes all of Uruguay, most of Entre Ríos and Corrientes provinces in Argentina, and the southern portion of Brazil's state of Rio Grande do Sul. The Humid Pampas include eastern Buenos Aires Province, and southern Entre Ríos Province. The Semiarid Pampas includes western Buenos Aires Province and adjacent portions of Santa Fe, Córdoba, and La Pampa provinces. The Pampas are bounded by the drier Argentine Espinal grasslands, which form a semicircle around the north, west, and south of the Humid Pampas.

Winters are cold to mild, and summers are hot and humid. Rainfall is fairly uniform throughout the year but is a little heavier during the summer. Annual rainfall is heaviest near the coast and decreases gradually further inland. Rain during the late spring and summer usually arrives in the form of brief heavy showers and thunderstorms. More general rainfall occurs the remainder of the year as cold fronts and storm systems move through. Although cold spells during the winter often send nighttime temperatures below freezing, snow is quite rare. In most winters, a few light snowfalls occur over inland areas.

Central Argentina boasts a successful agricultural business, with crops grown on the Pampas south and west of Buenos Aires. Much of the area is also used for cattle, and more recently, to cultivate vineyards in the Buenos Aires wine region. The area is also used for farming honey using European honeybees. These farming regions are particularly susceptible to flooding during the thunderstorms. The weather averages out to be 60 °F (16 °C) year-round in the Pampas.

Population

 Buenos Aires 17,196,396
 Córdoba 3,683,937
 Santa Fe 3,481,514 
 City of Buenos Aires 3,068,043
 Entre Ríos 1,360,443
 La Pampa 352,378

 Rio Grande do Sul 11,247,972
 
All departments 3,518,552
Total Population 43,909,235

Immigration
Starting in the 1840s but intensifying after the 1880s, European immigrants began to migrate to the Pampas, first as part of government-sponsored colonization schemes to settle the land and later as tenant farmers "working as either a sharecropper or as paid laborers for absentee landowners" in an attempt to make a living for themselves.

However, many immigrants eventually moved to more permanent employment in cities, as industrialization picked up after the 1930s. As a result, Argentina's history of immigration in Buenos Aires Province is typically associated with cities and urban life, unlike in Entre Ríos Province and Santa Fe Province, where European immigration took on a more rural profile.

See also

 Dry Pampa
 Estancia
 Federal University of Pampa
 Gaucho
 Humid Pampas
 José Froilán González - the "Pampas Bull"
 Luis Ángel Firpo - the "Wild Bull of Las Pampas"
 Médanos (dunes)
 Médanos wines
 Riograndense Republic
 Southern Cone
 South American jaguar

References

External links

 "The Pampas" in the Encyclopædia Britannica

 
Agriculture in Argentina
Climate of Argentina
Ecoregions of Argentina
Ecoregions of Brazil
Ecoregions of South America
Environment of Rio Grande do Sul
Grasslands of Argentina
Grasslands of Brazil
Grasslands of South America
Grasslands of Uruguay
Landforms of Buenos Aires Province
Landforms of Córdoba Province, Argentina
Landforms of Entre Ríos Province
Landforms of La Pampa Province
Landforms of Rio Grande do Sul
Landforms of Santa Fe Province
Landforms of Uruguay
Natural history of Uruguay
Natural regions of South America
Neotropical ecoregions
Physiographic provinces
Plains of Argentina
Plains of Brazil
Plains of South America
Quechua words and phrases
Regions of Argentina
Temperate grasslands, savannas, and shrublands